Jake Jarman (born 3 December 2001) is an elite English artistic gymnast from Peterborough, competing internationally for Great Britain, and for England at the Commonwealth Games. In his first major senior championships, the 2022 Commonwealth Games, Jarman won the gold medal in the team all-around, individual all-around, floor exercise  and vault, the first English male gymnast to win four gold medals at a single Games. A few weeks later in Munich, representing Great Britain, Jarman became European champion in the team and vault events, becoming the first British male to win European gold on vault.

Early life
Jarman was born on 3 December 2001 in Peterborough, England, to a British father and a Filipino mother from Cebu.

Career

Junior
In 2018, Jarman competed in the junior division of the European Championships, where he helped the British team take the silver medal behind Russia, and also picked up an individual silver on vault.

Senior
In 2021, at the age of 19, Jarman finished tenth in the all-around at the European Championships, and was selected as a reserve for the  2020 Olympics in Tokyo, Japan. The following year became his breakthrough year, taking the British senior titles in floor and vault. Selected to represent England at the 2022 Commonwealth Games in Birmingham, Jarman won gold in four events; the team competition, the  individual all-around, with England teammate James Hall in second place, the floor final with teammate Giarnni Regini-Moran in bronze, and the vault final with Regini-Moran in silver.

Jarman then competed for Great Britain at the 2022 European Championships, where he helped Great Britain win the team final for the first time in a decade, and only the second time ever. Additionally, he finished 8th in the individual all-around and qualified for the floor final, but initially missed the vault final on the two-per-nation rule despite qualifying in fifth. On individual finals day Jarman won bronze on floor before the withdrawal of teammate Giarnni Regini-Moran from the vault final to concentrate on parallel bars allowed Jarman to take part in that final. Taking advantage, Jarman won gold in the vault final, edging out Armenian rival Artur Davtyan on tie-break.

Competitive history

References

External links
 

 

Living people
2001 births
British male artistic gymnasts
English male artistic gymnasts
Commonwealth Games medallists in gymnastics
Commonwealth Games gold medallists for England
Gymnasts at the 2022 Commonwealth Games
European champions in gymnastics
21st-century British people
Sportspeople from Peterborough
English people of Filipino descent
Medalists at the World Artistic Gymnastics Championships
Medallists at the 2022 Commonwealth Games